Paines Plough is a touring theatre company founded in 1974 by writer David Pownall and director John Adams.

The company specialises exclusively in commissioning and producing new plays and helping playwrights develop their craft.

Over the past four decades, Paines Plough has established itself as a leading new writing company producing work by a wide range of playwrights across the UK and abroad. Collaboration with other theatre organisations is a vital feature of the company’s work as since 2010 the company has co-produced every show they've worked on with either a venue or a touring partner.  
 
In 2005, Paines Plough launched Future Perfect in conjunction with Channel 4. The scheme is a year-long attachment for emerging playwrights. Writers who have taken part include Lizzie Nunnery, Tom Morton-Smith and Duncan Macmillan.

In October 2010, the company won a TMA award for special achievement in regional theatre.

History 
Paines Plough was formed in 1974 over a pint of Paines bitter in the Plough pub by playwright David Pownall and director John Adams.

For over 40 years the company has commissioned, produced and toured new plays all over Britain and internationally.

Artistic directors

Roundabout 
Roundabout is Paines Plough's touring in-the-round auditorium. Roundabout was designed by Lucy Osborne and Emma Chapman in collaboration with Charcoalblue and Howard Eaton. It was built and developed by Factory Settings.

In 2010, Roundabout was commissioned, with a prototype built in 2011 with Sheffield Theatres. The opening season of Roundabout consisted of three new plays performed in repertory One Day When We Were Young by Nick Payne, Lungs by Duncan Macmillan and The Sound of Heavy Rain by Penelope Skinner.

In 2014, Roundabout was re-imagined to allow for touring. As part of Paines Plough's 40th anniversary celebrations a new season was commissioned for Roundabout. The plays debuted at Edinburgh Festival Fringe at Summerhall: Our Teacher's A Troll by Dennis Kelly, The Initiate by Alexandra Wood and Lungs and Every Brilliant Thing by Duncan Macmillan. After the run in Edinburgh Roundabout toured nationally to: Corn Exchange, Margate Theatre Royal, Hackney Showroom and The Civic in Barnsley.

Roundabout won the Theatre Building of the Year award at The Stage Awards.

In 2015, Roundabout toured with the same programme but added one new play to the repertory The Human Ear by Alexandra Wood. The auditorium once again took up residency at Summerhall for Edinburgh Festival Fringe before touring nationally to: Corn Exchange, Margate Theatre Royal, Southbank Centre, The Lowry, Lincoln Performing Arts Centre, Brewery Arts Centre in Kendal and Appetite in Stoke.

At the end of 2015, Paines Plough were granted money as part of Arts Council England's Strategic Touring Fund to tour Roundabout from 2016 to 2018 with seven nationwide partner venues: The Civic in Barnsley, Margate Theatre Royal, RevoLuton, Hall For Cornwall, The Lowry, Lincoln Performing Arts Centre, Brewery Arts Centre in Kendal and Appetite in Stoke. They will each receive a repertory of three new plays commissioned and produced by Paines Plough and partners.

The Roundabout plays for 2016 are Love, Lies and Taxidermy by Alan Harris, Growth by Luke Norris and I Got Superpowers for My Birthday by Katie Douglas.

Productions

2016 
 With a Little Bit of Luck by Sabrina Mahfouz, directed by Stef O'Driscoll and co-produced with Latitude Festival
 Broken Biscuits by Tom Wells, directed by James Grieve and co-produced with Live Theatre
 Ten Weeks by Elinor Cook, directed by Kate Wasserberg and co-produced with Royal Welsh College of Music and Drama
 Growth by Luke Norris, directed by George Perrin
 Love, Lies and Taxidermy by Alan Harris, directed by George Perrin and co-produced by Sherman Cymru and Theatr Clwyd
 I Got Superpowers for My Birthday by Katie Douglas, directed by George Perrin and co-produced with Halfmoon Theatre
 Bilal's Birthday by Nathan Bryon, directed by Liz Carlson and co-produced by Naked Angels
 322 Days by Lucy Gillespie, directed by Sean Linnen and co-produced by Naked Angels
 Come To Where I'm From

References

External links 
 

1974 establishments in the United Kingdom
Theatre companies in the United Kingdom